Ancient biography, or bios, as distinct from modern biography, was a genre of Greek and Roman literature interested in describing the goals, achievements, failures, and character of ancient historical persons and whether or not they should be imitated.

Subgenres
Authors of ancient bios, such as the works of Nepos and Plutarch's Parallel Lives imitated many of the same sources and techniques of the contemporary historiographies of ancient Greece, notably including the works of Herodotus and Thucydides. There were various forms of ancient biographies, including:
 philosophical biographies that brought out the moral character of their subject (such as Diogenes Laertius's Lives of Eminent Philosophers);
 literary biographies which discussed the lives of orators and poets (such as Philostratus's Lives of the Sophists);
 school and reference biographies that offered a short sketch of someone including their ancestry, major events and accomplishments, and death;
 autobiographies, commentaries and memoirs where the subject presents his own life;
 historical/political biography focusing on the lives of those active in the military, among other categories.

Gospels
The consensus among modern scholars is that the gospels are a subset of this ancient genre.

The consensus of modern scholars is that the Gospel of John was written in the genre of Greco-Roman biography. John contains many characteristics of those writings belonging to the genre of Greco-Roman biography, a) internally; including establishing the origins and ancestry of the author (John 1:1), a focus on the main subjects great words and deeds, a focus on the death of the subject and the subsequent consequences, b) externally; promotion of a particular hero (where non-biographical writings focus on the events surrounding the characters rather than the character himself), the domination of the use of verbs by the subject (in John, 55% of verbs are taken up by Jesus' deeds), the prominence of the final portion of the subjects life (one third of John's Gospel is taken up by the last week of Jesus' life, comparable to 26% of Tacitus's Agricola and 37% of Xenophon's Agesilaus), the reference to the main subject in the beginning of the text, etc.

References

Sources

Further reading
 
 
 

Greek literature
Ancient Roman culture
Gospel Books